Hannula is a Finnish-language surname. Notable people with the name include:

 Dick Hannula, American swimming coach
 Edvard Hannula (1859–1931), Finnish Lutheran clergyman and politician
 Heidi Hannula (born 1980), Finnish sprinter
 Janne Hannula (born 1982), Finnish football player
 Jim Hannula (born 1959), American football player
 Joose Olavi Hannula (1900–1944), Finnish colonel and historian
 Mandi Hannula (1880–1952), Finnish schoolteacher and politician
 Mika Hannula, (born 1979), Swedish ice hockey player
 Mikko Hannula, Finnish sports commentator and journalist
 Rodney R. Hannula, retired Major General in the National Guard of the United States
 Toni Hannula (born 1962), Finnish wrestler

Finnish-language surnames